Nazmul Ahsan is a Bangladesh Civil Servant and Secretary to the Ministry of Water Resources to the Bangladesh Government.

Early life 
Ahsan completed his undergraduate and masters in physics from the University of Dhaka.

Career 
Ahsan joined the Bangladesh Civil Service on 25 April 1994 as an administration cadre in the 13th batch.

Ahsan served as the Deputy Commissioner of Khulna District and Satkhira District.

In 2013, Ahsan served as a Deputy Secretary in the Ministry of Power, Energy and Mineral Resources.

On 6 December 2021, Ahsan was appointed Chairman of Petrobangla replacing ABM Abdul Fattah. He previously served as a director of administration of Petrobangla. He was an additional secretary at the Energy and Mineral Resources Division. He was part of a government meeting established to ensure uninterrupted electric supply during the 2022 Ramadan. In April 2022, he inaugurated a Mujib corner, named after President Sheikh Mujibur Rahman, at the Petrobangla headquarters in Karwan Bazar. On 11 December 2022, Ahsan was appointed as the Secretary to the Ministry of Water Resources and is currently serving under this role.

References 

Living people
Bangladeshi civil servants
University of Dhaka alumni
Year of birth missing (living people)